Bella Vista is a sector or neighborhood in the city of Santo Domingo in the Distrito Nacional of the Dominican Republic. Bella Vista is in particular populated by individuals from the upper class.

Sources 
Distrito Nacional sectors 

Populated places in Santo Domingo